Wakakoma Kenzo (born 20 April 1937 as Kenzo Ito – 31 August 2019) was a former sumo wrestler from Gojōme, Akita, Japan. He made his professional debut in May 1952 and reached the top division in September 1961. His highest rank was maegashira 8. He left the sumo world upon retirement from active competition in March 1962. He died on August 31, 2019, at the age of 82.

Fighting Style
He was a yotsu-sumo wrestler, and his most common winning techniques were shitatehineri (twisting underarm throw), oshidashi (push out) and shitatenage (underarm throw). He preferred a migi-yotsu (left hand outside, left right inside) grip on his opponent's mawashi.

Pre-modern career record
Kenzo joined Nishonoseki stable in May 1952 and was given the shikona "Ohibiki" (大響). He transferred to Shibatayama stable (later renamed Hanakago stable) in September 1952. He was promoted to sandanme in May 1954 and makushita in May 1955. In March 1960 he changed his shikona to "Wakakoma" (若駒). Three tournaments later in July 1960, he won the makushita yusho with a perfect 7–0 record at the rank of makushita 13 and was promoted to juryo for the following September 1960 tournament.
In 1953 the New Year tournament was begun and the Spring tournament began to be held in Osaka.

Juryo career
In his first tournament as a sekitori, Wakakoma finished with an 8–7 record. In the following November 1960 tournament, he won the juryo yusho with a strong 12–3 record. After two successive 10-5 records, he was promoted to makuuchi in September 1961.

Makuuchi career
He produced a solid 9–6 record in his top division debut, but followed with two consecutive losing records and was demoted back down to juryo after three tournaments in makuuchi. After falling down to juryo he abruptly announced his retirement after the March 1962 tournament.

Championships
1 Juryo Championship (November 1960)

1 Makushita Championship (July 1960)

Since the addition of the Kyushu tournament in 1957 and the Nagoya tournament in 1958, the yearly schedule has remained unchanged.

See also
Glossary of sumo terms
List of past sumo wrestlers
List of sumo tournament second division champions

References

1937 births
2019 deaths
Japanese sumo wrestlers
Sumo people from Akita Prefecture